FF, Ff, fF or ff may refer to:

Arts and entertainment

Games
 Fatal Frame, a survival horror video game series
 Fatal Fury, a fighting video game series
 Final Fantasy, a role-playing video game series
 Final Fight, a beat 'em up video game series
 Fortress Forever, a mod for the first-person shooter video game Half-Life 2
Fossil Fighters, a role-playing game video game series
 Free Fire, a battle royale video game by Garena

Music
 Fortissimo (ff), a dynamic indicator in music for "very loud"
 Fear Factory, an American metal band
 Fleet Foxes, an American indie folk band
 Foo Fighters, an American rock band
 Franz Ferdinand (band), a Scottish rock band
 Freestyle Fellowship, an American hip hop group

Movies
Fast & Furious, a media franchise centered on a series of action films that are largely concerned with illegal street racing

Other media
 ff – Südtiroler Wochenmagazin, an Italian weekly journal published in German language
 Fantastic Four, a superhero team appearing in comic books published by Marvel Comics
 Future Foundation, a fictional superhero team that replaced the Fantastic Four after the death of Johnny Storm, also published by Marvel Comics
 Logo of Finos Film, a former Greek film production company
 Found footage (pseudo-documentary), a film genre in which created footage is presented as if it were discovered
 Family Feud, an American syndicated game show
 Family Fortunes, a British game show based on the American version
 Freeform (TV channel), a US cable and satellite TV channel that is targeted to teens and young adults
 FF, the production code for the 1966–67 Doctor Who serial The Highlanders
 Fanfiction, unofficial writing about a work based on the work's characters and setting.
 Fire Force, a manga series about superhero firefighters with a serialized anime adaptation

Businesses and organizations
 Faraday Future, a car company 
 Fianna Fáil, political party in the Republic of Ireland and Northern Ireland
 Mukti Bahini (Freedom Fighters), an armed organizations who fought against the Pakistan Army during the Bangladesh Liberation War
 Tower Air (IATA code: FF), a certificated FAR 121 schedule and charter U.S. airline that operated from 1983 until 2000

Language
 ‹ff›, a Latin alphabet digraph, see List of digraphs in Latin alphabets#F
 Word-initial ff, digraph used initially
 Fula language (ISO 639-1 code), a language of West Africa

Science and technology

Computing
File format, any of numerous ways to encode information on digital media
.ff file format, used by game developer Infinity Ward to store data securely
.ff file format, used by imaging technologies corporation Agfa-Gevaert to store font outline data
Firefox, a web browser developed by Mozilla Foundation
Flip-flop (electronics), a digital electronic circuit memory element
Form Feed, a control character in the C0 control code set used in ASCII
Full-frame digital SLR, a camera fitted with an image sensor equivalent in size to traditional 35mm film

Transportation
Ferrari FF, a sports car 
Jensen FF, the first non all-terrain production car equipped with 4WD and an anti-lock braking system
Feet forwards motorcycle
Front-engine, front-wheel-drive layout, a car designed with a front engine and front-wheel drive, colloquially known as "FF" for short
Front freewheel, a crankset for bicycles

Other uses in science and technology
Fast forward, forward movement through a recording faster than the speed at which it was recorded
Femtofarad (fF), a unit of capacitance equal to 1×10−15 farads
Fill factor (disambiguation), a term applied in various geometrical models and electronic devices
Filtration fraction, in renal physiology
Frasnian-Famennian extinction (F-F), also known as the Late Devonian extinction
FFmpeg, a free and open source suite of video and audio encoding libraries.

Other uses
 255 (number) (hexadecimal: FF16), the largest numeric value possible for an unsigned byte
 ff., and the following pages (in a citation)
 FF, a bra size
 False flag, a diversionary or propaganda tactic
 Federal Front is an alliance in India that contests in the parliament and assembly elections. It was founded in 2019
 Follow Friday, a Twitter hashtag
 FontFont, a font library owned by FontShop International
 French Franc, a currency
 Frequent flyer, often abbreviated as FF# on itineraries or travel documents
 FF, a US Navy hull designation for a frigate